Heraklion University Sports Hall (Greek: Κλειστό Γήπεδο Πανεπιστημίου Ηρακλείου), is a small multi-purpose indoor arena that is located in the city of Heraklion, on the island of Crete, in Greece. It is located near the University of Crete. The indoor hall can be used to host several different events, with its primary use being to host basketball games, concerts, and the graduation ceremonies of the university. The arena's seating capacity for basketball games is 1,080 people.

History
Despite its small size, Heraklion University Sports Hall has been used as venue in several major FIBA international youth basketball tournaments. It hosted the FIBA Under-20 European Championship twice, hosting the 2014 tournament and the 2017 tournament. It also hosted the FIBA Under-19 World Cup twice, hosting the 2015 tournament and the 2019 tournament.

Major events hosted
2014 FIBA Under-20 European Championship
2015 FIBA Under-19 World Cup
2017 FIBA Under-20 European Championship
2019 FIBA Under-19 World Cup

Basketball venues in Greece
Buildings and structures in Heraklion
Handball venues in Greece
Indoor arenas in Greece
Volleyball venues in Greece